District of the Kanawha, was a Union Army district during the American Civil War.

Commander
 Brig. Gen. Jacob D. Cox Oct. 11, 1861 – August 15, 1862 
 Colonel Joseph Andrew Jackson Lightburn August 17, 1862 – October 1862
 Major General Jacob D. Cox Oct 1862

Posts in District of the Kanawha

 Post at Point Pleasant 1862
 Buffalo
 Charleston
 Gauley Bridge
 Camp Tompkins (1861–1862), near Gauley Bridge
 Summersville
 Fayetteville
 Fort Toland, (1862–1863), later renamed Fort Scammon.
 Battery McMullan, near Fort Toland
 Raleigh Courthouse (a.k.a. Beckley)

Notes

References
 National Archives, Guide to Federal Records; Records of United States Army Continental Commands, 1821–1920 (Record Group 393), 1817–1940 (bulk 1817–1920)

Union Army departments
1861 establishments in Virginia